State Road 269 (SR 269) is a part of the Indiana State Road that runs through rural Posey County in US state of Indiana.  The  of SR 269 that lie within Indiana serve as a mirror highway. None of the highway is listed on the National Highway System. The whole length is a rural two-lane highway.  The highway passes through farmland and woodland properties.

Route description
SR 269 begins at a rural intersection in Posey County at County Road 330 and Old Dam Road.  The route heads southeast away from Harmonie State Park, as a two-lane highway, passing through farmland and woodland.  The highway turns due east and heads towards SR 69.  SR 269 ends at a 3-way intersection with SR 69.

No segment of SR 269 is included as a part of the National Highway System (NHS).  The NHS is a network of highways that are identified as being most important for the economy, mobility and defense of the nation.  The highway is maintained by the Indiana Department of Transportation (INDOT) like all other state road in the state. The department tracks the traffic volumes along all state highways as a part of its maintenance responsibilities using a metric called average annual daily traffic (AADT). This measurement is a calculation of the traffic level along a segment of roadway for any average day of the year. In 2010, INDOT figured that 100 vehicles and 10 commercial vehicles AADT along the route.

Major intersections

References

External links

269
Transportation in Posey County, Indiana
State highways in the United States shorter than one mile